John Alan Means (born April 24, 1993) is an American professional baseball pitcher for the Baltimore Orioles of Major League Baseball (MLB). He made his MLB debut in 2018, and was an All-Star in 2019.

Means threw the tenth no-hitter in Orioles franchise history on May 5, 2021. In doing so, he also became the only pitcher in major league history to pitch a near-perfect game where the only spoiler was a baserunner who reached on a wild pitch strike three.

Career

Amateur and minor league career
Means attended Gardner Edgerton High School in Gardner, Kansas. He played for the school's baseball team, but was not recruited by any NCAA Division I college baseball program. The Atlanta Braves selected him in the 46th round of the 2011 MLB draft. He intended to sign with the Braves, but was injured when a Braves scout visited him, and the scout recommended he go to college. Means enrolled at Fort Scott Community College and played baseball at the junior college level for one year, before he transferred to West Virginia University to play for the West Virginia Mountaineers. In 2013, he played collegiate summer baseball with the Falmouth Commodores of the Cape Cod Baseball League. In 2014, his junior year at West Virginia, he went 6–2 with a 3.13 ERA in 12 starts.

The Orioles selected Means in the 11th round, with the 331st overall selection, of the 2014 MLB draft. He pitched for the Delmarva Shorebirds of the Class A South Atlantic League in 2015. He threw a no-hitter for Delmarva in July. He pitched for the Frederick Keys of the Class A-Advanced Carolina League in 2016, before receiving a midseason promotion to the Bowie Baysox of the Class AA Eastern League. He returned to Bowie in 2017. In 2018, he was promoted to the Norfolk Tides of the Class AAA International League.

Baltimore Orioles
The Orioles promoted Means to the major leagues on September 24, 2018. Means was named to the team's Opening Day roster for the 2019 season. After three appearances out of the bullpen, pitching to a 1.59 ERA in 5 innings, Means was moved into the Orioles' starting rotation.

Means made his first career start on April 9, 2019, against the Oakland Athletics, pitching three innings while allowing one run. After two more appearances, Means tossed five innings of one-run ball on April 24 against the White Sox, earning his third win of the year and first as a starter. On May 6, he threw a career-high seven innings, allowing just one run on three hits while striking out four in a 4–1 win over the Red Sox.

On June 28, 2019, Means was selected to his first All-Star Game as a 26-year old rookie, his 2.50 ERA ranking second among American League pitchers for the first half of the season. Starting 27 of 31 pitching appearances, he completed his rookie campaign at 12–11 with a 3.60 ERA. He finished second in American League Rookie of the Year voting. In the 2020 season, which was shortened by the COVID-19 pandemic, Means pitched to a 4.53 ERA, 42 strikeouts and a 2–4 record over  innings pitched in 10 games pitched, all starts.

The Orioles selected Means as their Opening Day starting pitcher for the 2021 season. On May 5, 2021, he threw a no-hitter against the Seattle Mariners, striking out 12 batters while facing the minimum of 27 batters. His only baserunner, Sam Haggerty, reached on a dropped third strike in the third inning and was subsequently caught trying to steal second base. It was the first no-hitter for the Orioles since 1991 and the first solo no-hitter since Jim Palmer no-hit the Oakland Athletics on August 13, 1969. It was also the first no-hitter in MLB history where the only baserunner reached base on an uncaught third strike. On May 10, Means was named the AL Player of the Week for week of May 3 to May 9. On June 6, Means went onto the 10-day injured list with a strained shoulder. Means was activated on July 20, after missing over a month of action.

Means was named the Opening Day starter for the 2022 season, and pitched on April 7 against the Tampa Bay Rays. On April 13, Means pitched four innings against the Milwaukee Brewers before his removal from the game. He was diagnosed with elbow strain two days later and placed on the 10-day injured list. Means was transferred to the 60-day IL on April 17. Doctors determined that Means needed Tommy John surgery, which prematurely ended his 2022 season. He officially underwent surgery on May 11, 2022. On May 21, Means agreed to a two-year, $5.925 million contract with the Orioles to avoid arbitration.

Personal life
Means' father Alan worked with the International Brotherhood of Teamsters for more than 30 years. Alan was the Local 41 (Kansas City, Missouri) Secretary/Treasurer just before his death from pancreatic cancer at age 57 on August 5, 2020. His younger brother Jake played college baseball at Indiana State University before being selected by the Kansas City Royals in the 22nd round (475th overall) of the 2019 Major League Baseball Draft.

Means is married to former professional soccer player Caroline Stanley. They had their first child, a son, in 2020. Means is a Christian.

See also

List of Major League Baseball no-hitters

References

External links

Living people
1993 births
Sportspeople from Olathe, Kansas
Baseball players from Kansas
Major League Baseball pitchers
American League All-Stars
Baltimore Orioles players
Falmouth Commodores players
Fort Scott Greyhounds baseball players
West Virginia Mountaineers baseball players
Aberdeen IronBirds players
Delmarva Shorebirds players
Frederick Keys players
Bowie Baysox players
Norfolk Tides players